Scared Scriptless could refer to:

 A late-night improvised comedy show by the Court Jesters staged at the Court Theatre in Christchurch, New Zealand since 1990
 Scared Scriptless Improv, an improvisational comedy troupe in Anchorage, Alaska
The popular student-run improv group at Saint Olaf College